Film Festival #1 is an adventure published by Event Horizon Productions in 1997 for the action-adventure role-playing game Hong Kong Action Theatre!

Description
Film Festival #1 is a 120-page perfect-bound softcover book containing 15 adventures for the Hong Kong Action Theatre! role-playing game. The adventures were written by Gareth-Michael Skarka, John R. Phythyon Jr., David Brandon Sturm, Matt Harrop, and Aaron Rosenberg, and are evenly divided between Hong Kong Action Theatre!s three genres: Gunplay, Martial Arts, and Bizarre Fantasy.

Gunplay 
 "Two Fisted Justice" 
 "To Catch a Thief"
 "Last Chance" 
 "Full Auto"
 "Dead On Arrival"

Martial arts
 "Five Fists of Kung Fu" 
 "Five Fists of Kung Fu II: Martial Fury"
 "Police Target" 
 "Deadly Relations"
 "The Beat"

Bizarre fantasies
 "Son of the Dragon II: Dragonfist" 
 "Magic Hunter" 
 "Dragonknights" 
 "The Mighty Heroes"
 "Ghost Ship" 

The book also includes a movie title generator.

Reception
In the February 1998 edition of Dragon (Issue #244), Rick Swan acknowledged he was already a fan of the Hong Kong Action Theatre! RPG, and thought Film Festival 1 "presents 15 top-notch adventures." Swan's favorites were "Five Fists of Kung Fu", and "Magic Hunter".

References

Role-playing game adventures
Role-playing game supplements introduced in 1997